Maxwell Brian Evans (born 12 September 1983) is a rugby union player who has won 44 caps for Scotland. He plays at centre and wing, and has been without a club since being released by Castres at the end of the 2015 season.

Early life and education
Evans was born in Torquay, England. He attended Wellington College with his brother and former Scottish international, Thom, as well as friends and former rugby team mates James Haskell and Paul Doran-Jones of Wasps RFC.

Career
Evans played golf professionally in Portugal from 2004–06 while recovering from a back injury suffered while playing for Harlequins' academy side.

Evans played for London Scottish in 2005–06 with former Scottish international Kenny Logan and former Waratahs winger and Australia A & 7's star Matt Dowling.

He earned his first cap for Scotland against Canada in November 2008. He scored his first try for Scotland on 8 February 2009, after coming on as a substitute for his younger brother, Thom, in the 2009 Six Nations Championship match against Wales. Thom, who also played for the Glasgow Warriors, was later forced to retire from rugby on 1 July 2010 as a result of a spinal injury he sustained in Scotland's 2010 Six Nations Championship match against Wales. On 10 May 2009, while playing for Glasgow against the Ospreys, Max sustained an injury to his knee, ruling him of competition for at least six months.

On 14 February 2011 Evans confirmed he would leave the Glasgow Warriors to join Castres. He was released from Castres in June 2015.

Media 
In November 2017, Evans was revealed as one of the contestants who would take part in the tenth series of Dancing on Ice. He was partnered with professional ice skater Ale Izquierdo. The couple finished in third place on 11 March 2018.

Personal life
He is a cousin of radio presenter Chris Evans.

In 2014, he married Katy Johnson; they separated in December 2016 and eventually divorced. In 2019, he became engaged to Lauren Jamieson, sister of Olympics swimmer Michael Jamieson; they separated the following year. In February 2021, he was reportedly expecting his first child, a daughter, with Debora Casimiro.

References

External links
 Scotland profile

1983 births
Living people
Scottish rugby union players
Rugby union centres
Rugby union wings
Glasgow Warriors players
Castres Olympique players
People educated at Wellington College, Berkshire
Scotland international rugby union players
London Scottish F.C. players
Scottish expatriate rugby union players
Expatriate rugby union players in France
Scottish expatriate sportspeople in France
Rugby union players from Torquay